Drygalski may refer to:
Erich von Drygalski
Places
Drygalski Island, Southern Ocean
Drygalski Glacier (Antarctica)
Drygalski Glacier (Tanzania)
Drygalski Basin, Antarctica
Drygalski Mountains, Antarctica
Drygalski Ice Tongue, Antarctica
Mount Drygalski, Antarctica
Drygalski (crater) on the moon